St. Joseph's Morrow Park Catholic Secondary School (locally known as St. Joseph's Morrow Park, SJMPCSS, SJMP, or sporadically Morrow Park) is a publicly funded all-girls secondary school located in Toronto, Ontario. It was founded by the Sisters of St. Joseph in 1960 and is attached to the Sisters' motherhouse at Morrow Park. The Sisterhood was founded on October 15, 1650 in Le Puy-en-Velay, France, by Jean-Pierre Medaille, a French Jesuit.

The school is part of the Toronto Catholic District School Board, formerly the Metropolitan Separate School Board since 1987. It is a semestered school and presently has an enrolment of 1,076 students. The school has a range of programs that include resource assistance, English as a second language (ESL), and gifted programs such as the Queen's Enrichment Program, Catholic Schools United Nations Assembly, and Advanced Placement (AP).

St. Joseph's Morrow Park is the sister school of Brebeuf College School.

History

St. Joseph's Morrow Park Catholic Secondary School is a school for girls. It is attached to  the Motherhouse of the Sisters of St. Joseph's of Toronto. In the year 1648, Jean-Pierre Medaille founded the congregation in LePuy, France. The community was active in giving support to the orphans, caring for the sick, and educating the younger students. In 1851, the Sisters of St. Joseph came to Toronto. St. Joseph's Morrow Park came about as a result of the relocation and expansion of St. Joseph's which was then operating at Bay and Wellesley. The new Motherhouse was built on Willowdale on a property given to the congregation. A day school and boarding school were part of this complex. In September 1960, St. Joseph's Morrow Park opened its doors with 147 students. 

The 9th and 10th grades were placed under the sanction of the Metropolitan Separate School Board (now the Toronto Catholic District School Board) in 1967 while the tuition fees continued to be used for grades 11–13. In 1984, when the Province of Ontario decided that Catholic secondary schools were to be fully funded, Morrow Park was expanded into high school grades up to grade 13. By 1987, the operations and maintenance of SJMP were passed on to the MSSB.

Relocation and controversy

In 2006, the Sisters of St. Joseph announced that Morrow Park, the school property, along with the school had been sold  to Tyndale University College and Seminary. The TCDSB has chosen a site for the school.

It would have been relocated at Bayview and Finch on the current site of Blessed Trinity Catholic Elementary School (and elementary school were to relocate temporarily to the former St. Leonard Catholic School near Leslie Avenue and Finch Avenue East). The new school would accommodate 800 students in grades JK-12.  The elementary school would be co-ed, but the high school would remain an all-girls school to coincide with the original intent of the creation of St. Joseph's Morrow Park in 1960. Those changes were rendered moot as the Board decided to extend of the lease of St. Joseph's Morrow Park Catholic Secondary School at Tyndale until December 31, 2020. With the changes, the TCDSB has also received permission from the Ministry of Education to purchase the site at 500 Cummer Avenue on the former Cummer Avenue Public School / Cummer LINC (since closed in 2011) to accommodate construction of the new St. Joseph Morrow Park Catholic Secondary School.

Board officials unveiled the two concepts for the new SJMP school at a public meeting held on June 19, 2013:
“Concept A” shows St. Joseph's huddled between 30 townhomes bordering Bayview Ave., at Cummer Ave.
“Concept B’’ shows those townhomes wiped out. Instead of a 55-by-91-metre field hockey space, students would get a 72-metre-by-120-metre soccer field.

In order for the school board to go through with “Concept B” the city would have to buy the property from willing sellers or expropriate the land from unwilling sellers, which they are legally entitled to do under the Ontario Municipal Board's Expropriation Act. Toronto area councilor David Shiner stated he was surprised that board officials were considering expropriation, saying that Cummer and Bayview site would better suite a school of 400-500 students, than the planned 800-1000 student school. The TCDSB also owns the former St. Leonard school near Finch Ave. E. and Leslie St., which is currently leased. However, that site is about the same size and is “outside the ideal area. . . . Historically, the school has always been in (this) community.’

On August 27, 2015, the TCDSB trustees voted 6–4 to expropriate 17 townhomes on the southern end.

Construction of the newly built $24.75 million secondary school started in May 2018. The new facility construction was originally set to be completed in September 2020, but it was pushed to January 2021 due to the COVID-19 pandemic in Toronto. After months of imminent closures and high vaccine rates, the school fully opened in September 2021 in time for the new 2021-22 academic year.

Overview

2018–2019 EQAO results 
90% of Grade 9 Academic math students were at Level 3 or 4.  There were 110 students in the Grade 9 Academic classes during this time frame, 0% of whom were students with Special Education Needs (excluding gifted).

24% of Grade 9 Applied math students were at Level 3 or 4.  There were 46 students in the Grade 9 Applied classes during this time frame, 35% of whom were students with Special Education Needs (excluding gifted).

90% of first-time eligible students were successful in the Grade 10 literacy test.  75% of previously eligible students were successful in the Grade 10 literacy test.

Fraser Institute ranking 

The Fraser Institute's 2018/2019 report on St. Joseph's Morrow Park gave it an overall grade of 8.1/10, ranking it at 52 of 718 publicly funded secondary schools in Ontario.

Uniform
The attendees wear a school uniform consisting of the MacKinnon plaid kilt, black slacks, green vest/pullover, white blouse, green or brown socks/leotards and brown or black shoes.

Alumnae 
 Sandrine Holt (actress)
 Karen Stintz (Chair of the Toronto Transit Commission, 2010–2014)
 Marie Henein (lawyer)

See also
List of high schools in Ontario

References

External links
St. Joseph's Morrow Park Catholic Secondary School

Toronto Catholic District School Board
Girls' schools in Canada
High schools in Toronto
Catholic secondary schools in Ontario
Educational institutions established in 1960
1960 establishments in Ontario
North York